NT Stadium is a football stadium in Lak Si, Bangkok, Thailand. It is used for football matches at several competitions and levels and was the home stadium of TOT Sport Club, which was dissolved in 2016. The stadium holds 5,000 spectators.

References

External links
Stadium information
Stadium pictures at Frank Jasperneite

Football venues in Thailand
Sports venues completed in 2010
2010 establishments in Thailand
Sports venues in Bangkok